The Export–Import Bank of the United States (EXIM) is the official export credit agency (ECA) of the United States federal government. Operating as a wholly owned federal government corporation, the bank "assists in financing and facilitating U.S. exports of goods and services", particularly when private sector lenders are unable or unwilling to provide financing. Its current chairman and president, Reta Jo Lewis, was confirmed by the Senate on February 9, 2022.

The Export-Import Bank was established in 1934 as the Export-Import Bank of Washington by an executive order of President Franklin D. Roosevelt. Its stated goal was "to aid in financing and to facilitate exports and imports and the exchange of commodities between the United States and other Nations or the agencies or nationals thereof." The bank's first transaction was a $3.8 million loan to Cuba in 1935 for the purchase of U.S. silver ingots. In 1945, it was made an independent agency within the executive branch by Congress. 

Under federal law, the EXIM must be reauthorized by Congress every four to five years. Following a brief lapse in Congressional authorization in July 1, 2015, which prevented the bank from engaging in new business, it was reauthorized through September 2019 via the Fixing America's Surface Transportation Act of December 2015. In December 2019, President Donald Trump signed the Export-Import Bank Extension into law as part of the Further Consolidated Appropriations Act, 2020, which authorized the bank until December 31st, 2026.

Over its lifetime, the Export-Import Bank has helped finance several historic projects including the Pan-American Highway, the Burma Road, and post-WWII reconstruction. While supporters argue that the bank allows small and medium sized business to participate in the global market, critics allege that it shows favoritism to large corporations and special interests.

Overview 

The Export–Import Bank of the United States (EXIM) is a government agency that provides a variety of tools intended to aid the export of American goods and services. The mission of the Bank is to create and sustain U.S. jobs by financing sales of U.S. exports to international buyers. EXIM equips U.S exporters and their customers with tools such as buyer financing, export credit insurance, and access to working capital. Second, when U.S exporters face foreign competition backed by other governments, EXIM provides buyer financing to match or counter the financing offered by almost 96 ECAs around the world. The Bank is chartered as a government corporation by the Congress of the United States; it was last chartered for a three-year term in 2012. The Charter details the Bank's authorities and limitations. Among them is the principle that EXIM does not compete with private sector lenders, but rather provides financing for transactions that would otherwise not occur because commercial lenders are either unable or unwilling to accept the political or commercial risk inherent in the deal.

The EXIM's products are intended to assist export sales for any American export company regardless of size. The bank's charter provides that EXIM makes available "not less than 20%" of its lending authority to small businesses although they have often fallen short of the 20% threshold. In fiscal year 2013 however, 76% of the value of loans and guarantees went to the top 10 recipients.

Similar banks, known generally as export credit agencies (ECAs), are operated by 60 foreign countries. As the United States is a member of the Organisation for Economic Co-operation and Development (OECD) they conduct their activities by obeying OECD rules and principles. The goal is to permit exporters in various countries to compete on the basis of the quality of their goods and services, not on preferential financing terms. ECAs of countries, which are not participants of the OECD, such as the China Exim Bank, Ex-Im Bank of Russia, Brazil, and India, are not required by their governments to follow OECD rules.

Offices 
The bank has offices in Chicago, Detroit, Minneapolis, New York, Miami, Atlanta, Houston, McKinney (Dallas), Orange County (California), San Diego, San Francisco and Seattle.

 R. Walton Moore, (Chairman) 1934–1941
 George N. Peek, (President) 1934–1935
 R. Walton Moore, (Chairman) 1934–1941
 Warren Lee Pierson, (President) 1936–1945
 Wayne Chatfield-Taylor, (President) 1945
 Jesse H. Jones, (Chairman) 1941–1943
 Leo T. Crowley, (Chairman) 1943–1945
 William McC. Martin, Jr., (Chairman) 1946–1949
 Herbert E. Gaston, (Chairman) 1949–1953
 Glen E. Edgerton, (Chairman) 1953–1953
 Glen E. Edgerton, (Chairman) 1954–1955
 Lynn U. Strambaugh, (Vice Chairman) 1954–1960
 Samuel C. Waugh, (Chairman) 1955–1961
 Tom Killefer, (Vice Chairman) 1960–1962
 Harold F. Linder, (Chairman) 1961–1968
 Walter C. Sauer, (Vice Chairman) 1962–1976
 Henry Kearns, (Chairman) 1969–1973
 William J. Casey, (Chairman) 1974–1976
 Stephen M. DuBrul Jr., (Chairman) 1976–1977
 Delio E. Gianturco, (Vice Chairman) 1976–1977
 John L. Moore, Jr., (Chairman) 1977–1981
 H. K. Allen, (Vice Chairman) 1978–1981
 William H. Draper III, (Chairman) 1981–1986
 Charles E. Lord, (Vice Chairman) 1982–1983
 John A. Bohn, Jr., (Vice Chairman) 1984–1986
 John A. Bohn, Jr., (Chairman) 1986–1989
 William F. Ryan, (Vice Chairman) 1986–1989
 John D. Macomber, (Chairman) 1989–1992
 Eugene K. Lawson, (Vice Chairman) 1989–1993
 Rita M. Rodriguez, (Acting Chairman) 1993–1993
 Kenneth D. Brody, (Chairman) 1993–1995
 Martin A. Kamarck, (Vice Chairman) 1993–1996
 Martin A. Kamarck, (Chairman) 1996–1997
 Rita M. Rodriguez, (Acting Chairman) 1997–1997
 James A. Harmon, (Chairman) 1997–2001
 Jackie M. Clegg, (Vice Chairman) 1997–2001
 John E. Robson, (Chairman) 2001–2002
 Eduardo Aguirre, (Vice Chairman) 2001–2003
 Philip Merrill, (Chairman) 2002–2005
 April Foley, (Vice Chairman) 2003–2005
 James H. Lambright, (Chairman) 2005–2009
 Linda M. Conlin, (Vice Chairman 2006–2009)
 Wanda Felton, (Vice Chairman) 2011–2013,2014–2016
 John A. McAdams, (Acting Vice Chairman) 2013
 Fred P. Hochberg, (Chairman) 2009–2017
 Charles J. Hall, (Acting Vice Chairman) 2016–2017 (Acting Chairman) 2017
 Scott Schloegel, (Acting Vice Chairman) 2017–2019
 Jeffrey Gerrish, (Acting Chairman) 2018–2019
 Kimberly A. Reed, (Chairman) 2019–2021
 Reta Jo Lewis, (Chairman) 2022–present

 William McC. Martin, Jr. 1945–1946
 Clarence E. Gauss 1946–1952
 Wilson L. Townsend 1952–1953
 Hawthorne Arey 1949–1953
 Hawthorne Arey 1954–1961
 George A. Blowers 1954–1961
 Vance Brand 1954–1959
 James S. Bush 1959–1963
 George Docking 1961–1964
 Charles M. Meriwether 1961–1965
 Elizabeth S. May 1964–1969
 Hobart Taylor, Jr. 1965–1968
 Tom Lilley 1965–1972
 John C. Clark 1969–1976
 R. Alex McCullough 1969–1977
 Mitchell P. Kobelinski 1973–1976
 Margaret W. Kahliff 1976–1982
 Donald E. Stingel 1977–1981
 Thibaut de Saint Phalle 1977–1981
 Richard W. Heldridge 1982–1988
 Rita M. Rodriguez 1982–1999
 James E. Yonge 1982–1984
 Richard H. Hughes 1985–1985
 Simon C. Fireman 1986–1989
 Richard Houseworth 1988–1991
 Constance B. Harriman 1991–1994
 Cecil B. Thompson 1991–1994
 Maria Luisa Haley 1994–1999
 Julie Belaga 1994–1999
 Dan Renberg 1999–2003
 Dorian Vanessa Weaver 1999–2003
 Max Cleland 2003–2007
 Linda M. Conlin 2004–2006
 J. Joseph Grandmaison 2006–2009
 Bijan R. Kian 2006–2011
 Diane Farrell 2007–2011
 Larry Walther 2011–2013
 Wanda Felton 2011–2013, 2014–2016
 Fred P. Hochberg 2009–Present
 Sean Robert Mulvaney 2011–2015
 Patricia M. Loui 2011–2015
 Charles J. Hall 2016–2017

History

Early history (1934–1944) 
EXIM was organized originally as a District of Columbia banking corporation by Executive Order 6581 from Franklin D. Roosevelt on February 2, 1934, under the name Export–Import Bank of Washington. The stated goal was "to aid in financing and to facilitate exports and imports and the exchange of commodities between the United States and other Nations or the agencies or nationals thereof", with the immediate goal of making loans to the USSR and Latin America. Roosevelt created a Second Export–Import Bank of Washington with Executive Order 6638 on March 9, 1934, with the specific goal of aiding trade with Cuba. The Bank's first transaction was a $3.8 million loan to Cuba in 1935 for the purchase of U.S. silver ingots. The First and Second Export–Import Banks were combined in 1936 when Congress transferred the obligations of the Second Export–Import Bank to the first. Congress continued the bank as a government agency, using a series of laws between 1935 and 1943 to make it subordinate to various government departments.

Independent agency (1945–present) 
Congress made the bank an independent agency on July 31, 1945, with the Export–Import Bank Act of 1945. On March 13, 1968, further legislation changed the name to "Export–Import Bank of the United States". EXIM became a self-sustaining (self-funding) agency in 2007, though the loans remain backed by the government.

The Government Corporation Control Act of 1945 requires the Bank to be reauthorized by Congress every four to five years. Reauthorizations were approved in 1947, 1951, 1957, 1963, 1968, 1971, 1974, 1978, 1983, 1986, 1992, 1997, 2002, 2006, 2012, 2014, 2015, and 2019:

It was last chartered for a three-year term in 2012 and in September 2014 was extended through June 30, 2015. Congressional authorization for the bank lapsed as of July 1, 2015. As a result, the bank could not engage in new business, but it continued to manage its existing loan portfolio. Five months later, after the successful employment of the rarely used discharge petition procedure in the House of Representatives, Congress reauthorized the bank until September 2019 via the Fixing America's Surface Transportation Act signed into law on December 4, 2015, by President Barack Obama. In December 2019, President Donald Trump signed the Export-Import Bank Extension into law as part of the Further Consolidated Appropriations Act, 2020 (P.L. 116-94) which authorized the bank until December 31st, 2026.

Projects assisted

Pan-American Highway 
The Pan-American Highway runs from Alaska to Chile through 14 countries with important transportation links to nearly all of continental Latin America. The highway was constructed beginning in 1936 with the last phase complete in 1980.

EXIM Bank credits and loans supported construction of the Pan-American Highway in Mexico, Honduras, Guatemala, Nicaragua, El Salvador, Costa Rica, Panama, Colombia, Ecuador, Peru and Chile. In Paraguay, Argentina, and Bolivia EXIM supported construction of highway spurs connected to the Pan-American Highway. EXIM approved twenty credits to U.S. companies including Caterpillar, Koehring Co., Allis-Chalmers Manufacturing, The Galion Iron Works, and Thew Shovel to help build the highway.

Burma Road 
Constructed between 1937 and 1938, the 717-mile Burma Road links Lashio in present-day Myanmar (previously Burma) to Kunming in Yunnan Province, China. Construction of the road began in 1937 at the start of the second Sino-Japanese War (1937–1945). With Japan able to control port access in China and most of Southeast Asia, the Chinese built a road that would allow transportation of men and goods from a railhead at Rangoon that had access to Burma's ports. From 1939 to 1942 the Burma Road served as a lifeline for military goods and support in the fight against the Japanese in the Far East.

The $25 million credit approved by EXIM in December 1938 was crucial in ensuring that the supply route remained open by providing the transportation vehicles and support material to operate the new road and by providing China with purchasing power during WWII. An additional $20 million to the Universal Trading Corporation was approved in 1940. A 1939 journal article in Foreign Affairs noted that China used part of the $25 million to purchase 2,000 three-ton trucks from Ford, Chrysler, and General Motors.

Post-WWII reconstruction and the Marshall Plan 
EXIM played a critical role during the years between the end of Lend-Lease (September 1945) and the beginning of the Marshall Plan and the World Bank's first authorizations (May 1947 – 1948). At the end of WWII, it was recognized that the U.S. did not have a credit facility capable of handling the demand that would result from the cessation of hostilities. One of the major rationales behind the Export–Import Bank Act of 1945, the basis of EXIM's current charter document, was the necessity to dramatically increase EXIM's lending capacity to adequately respond to Europe's post-war reconstruction needs. The 1945 EXIM Annual Report predicated EXIM's role in the immediate post-WWII period: "the Export–Import Bank was to be the principal source of long-term dollar loans for an extended period of time." This assertion was based on the lack of interest by private capital in lending to foreign government buyers and delays in ratification of the Articles of Agreement for the International Monetary Fund and the International Bank for Reconstruction and Development. The Export–Import Bank Act of 1945 increased lending authority from $750 million to $3.5 billion, almost a fourfold increase to help address these shortfalls.

In 1945 and 1946 credit was offered to France, Denmark, Norway, Belgium, the Netherlands, Turkey, Czechoslovakia, Finland, Italy, Ethiopia, Greece, Poland and Austria to purchase equipment, facilities, and services from the United States. The financing was designed to aid reconstruction of the nations and to repair their import and export capability through the purchase of new machinery, currency exchange, and improvements and repairs to infrastructure and transportation systems.

When the Marshall Plan was initiated in 1948, EXIM concentrated its lending on non-Economic Recovery Act nations in North and South America.

First credits to post-Soviet nations 
When the Berlin Wall fell in 1989 and the USSR was dissolved in 1991, U.S. companies were able to conduct business freely with Eastern Europe for the first time since the end of WWII. EXIM was one of the first financial institutions to provide financing for exports to the former Soviet Union, Poland, Czechoslovakia and the newly independent nations that emerged after 1991. In 1990, President George H.W. Bush waived the Jackson–Vanik amendment, which had officially blocked normal trade relations with communist countries since 1975. This waiver permitted all E guarantee and insurance programs to U.S. companies wanting to do business with the USSR and several former communist countries.

EXIM resumed business with Czechoslovakia in March 1990. On January 25, 1991, EXIM approved the first transaction to Czechoslovakia since 1947. Financed by First Interstate Bank of Los Angeles, CA, the guarantee allowed Tonak Hat Company to purchase computers from a U.S. company, Digital Equipment Corporation of Massachusetts. Since 1991, EXIM has supported exports to 25 of the nations that emerged after the fall of the Iron Curtain.

First credit to India 
After a visit to India in January 2015, President Obama announced that the EXIM will finance $1 billion of exports of 'Made-in-America' products, the U.S. Overseas Private Investment Corporation will lend $1 billion to small- and medium-sized rural enterprises and the U.S. Trade and Development Agency will commit $2 billion for renewable energy. Obama and Modi agreed on issues that had previously stopped U.S. companies from establishing nuclear reactors in India.

Support 
Supporters say that the bank emphasizes trying to help small and medium size businesses expand their exporting capabilities. CEO and president of the National Association of Manufacturers, Jay Timmons stated: "The EXIM plays a critical role in manufacturer's ability to export to new markets and keep up with growing global competition. The Bank assists nearly 290,000 export related jobs and each year is helping more and more small and medium-sized manufacturers grow their businesses and hire new workers. More than 85% of all EXIM transactions directly benefit small business exporters—the economic engine that powers our economy and job creation."

When Obama was campaigning for president in 2008, he stated that the Export–Import Bank had "become little more than a fund for corporate welfare."  During the Bank's reauthorization struggle, May 2012, he said that the Export–Import Bank plays a very important role in reaching his goal of doubling exports over 5 years. At the reauthorization ceremony Obama stated: "We're helping thousands of businesses sell more of their products and services overseas, in the process, we're helping them create jobs here at home. And we're doing it at no extra cost to the taxpayer."

Criticism

Special interests-based criticism
The Bank has been criticized for favoring special interests. These interests have included corporations such as Boeing or Enron as well as foreign governments and nationals, such as a 1996 $120 million low-interest loan to the China National Nuclear Power Corporation (CNNP) supporting the export of US-made technology.

More recently the bank authorized $33.6 million in loans to Abengoa, a Spanish Green energy company on which former Governor Bill Richardson is a member of the board of directors. As of May 2014, Richardson was also listed as a member of the advisory committee of the Export–Import Bank.

Boeing 
65% of loan guarantees over 2007 and 2008 went to companies purchasing Boeing aircraft. In 2012, the Bank's loan guarantees became even more skewed, with 82 percent of them going to Boeing customers.

However, EXIM supporters note that Boeing is the largest exporter in the United States by dollar value, and must be protected in their capacity as the only remaining comprehensive U.S. commercial aircraft manufacturer. Support of Boeing is seen as particularly critical as Comac, China's state-owned and heavily subsidized commercial aircraft manufacturer, aggressively seeks to leech market share from both Boeing and Airbus. Also important to note, Boeing is not the only US aircraft manufacturer previously supported by EXIM.  During the 1930s, 40s, and 50s, EXIM supported other US aviation manufacturers such as the Douglas Aircraft Company, the Consolidated Vultee Aircraft Company (Convair), and the Lockheed Aircraft Corporation, before the firms were driven out of existence by competition or acquisition.

The cost and effectiveness of the bank are controversial. While the EXIM projects will earn the U.S. government an average of $1.4 billion per year for the next 10 years, an alternative analysis from the Congressional Budget Office found that the program would lose about $2 billion during the same period, partly due to discrepancies in how credit risk is accounted for. Both conservative and liberal groups have been critical of the bank, and some continue to demand its termination.

Budget-based criticism
Critics also purport the existence of "unseen" costs created by the Export–Import Bank's subsidies, including artificially raising the price of new airplanes and potentially adding $2 billion to the deficit over the next decade.

Forbes contributor Doug Bandow wrote in 2014, "The agency piously claims not to provide subsidies since it charges fees and interest, but it exists only to offer business a better credit deal than is available in the marketplace. The Bank uses its ability to borrow at government rates to provide loans, loan guarantees, working capital guarantees, and loan insurance."

If the normal principles of economics or finance are applied, then it is seen by critics as unlikely that the bank has profited and most unlikely that it makes the annual profit that it has stated, because the bank's calculations of profit fail to make proper adjustment for risk. Best practice in finance and economics, as well as in banking, is to adjust the cost of capital or discount rate to reflect risk, or, equivalently, to use a fair-value estimate. On this basis the criticism is that "This simple approach—which is based on a method outlined in a National Bureau of Economic Research paper by Debbie Lucas of the Massachusetts Institute of Technology—suggests that the EXIM's long-term loan guarantee program actually provides guarantees at a loss for taxpayers, not a profit. Moreover, this analysis reveals that the EXIM's loan guarantees are made at sufficiently generous terms that borrowers receive subsidies of about 1% of the amount borrowed. That translates into a $200 million cost for taxpayers on the $21 billion in loans that the bank will make in 2012."

Environment-based criticism
In February 2009, the EXIM settled a seven-year-long legal proceeding brought by Friends of the Earth, Greenpeace together with the cities of Boulder, Arcata and Oakland. The plaintiffs said that the EXIM and the Overseas Private Investment Corporation provided financial assistance to oil and other fossil fuel projects without first evaluating the projects' climate change impacts. In 2005, the plaintiffs were granted legal standing to sue. This is considered a landmark decision because it is the first time that a federal court has specifically granted legal standing for a lawsuit exclusively challenging the federal government's failure to evaluate the impacts of its actions on the Earth's climate and U.S. citizens. In its settlement agreement, the EXIM agrees to evaluate the carbon dioxide emissions as part of its determination for qualification for a project. However, EXIM fossil fuel financing and associated greenhouse gas emissions grew swiftly after the settlement agreement, coinciding with Chairman Hochberg's tenure. Between 2009 and 2012, EXIM fossil fuel financing grew from $2.56 billion to nearly $10 billion.

Environmental groups in 2010 said that the EXIM was on a "fossil fuel binge", which "makes a mockery" of President Obama's stated commitment to phase out fossil fuel subsidies. In December 2009, EXIM Directors approved $3 billion in financing for the ExxonMobil-led Papua New Guinea Liquid Gas project in December 2009. The project has reportedly caused violence and in April 2012, the Papua New Guinea government ordered in troops to quell opposition from villagers after a landslide linked to a quarry that had been used by the project killed an estimated 25 people.

In 2010, environmental groups criticized the EXIM Directors for approving $917 million worth of financing for the 3,960 megawatt coal-fired Sasan Ultra Mega Power Project in India after initially rejecting the project on climate change grounds. Environmental groups say that in reversing the decision the agency's Chairman, Fred Hochberg and Board of Directors "caved in" to political pressure from Wisconsin politicians. In 2011, several environmental groups protested at Export–Import Bank headquarters, unsuccessfully urging Chairman Hochberg and Board of Directors to reject $805 million in financing for the 4,800 megawatt Kusile coal-fired power plant in South Africa, which environmental groups say is the largest carbon emitting project in the agency's history, which will not alleviate poverty but will emit excessive local air pollution, which health experts say causes damage the respiratory, cardiovascular, and nervous systems and deaths resulting from heart disease, cancer, stroke, and chronic lower respiratory diseases.

In December 2012, the Center for Biological Diversity, Pacific Environment, and Turtle Island Restoration Network filed a lawsuit against Chairman Hochberg and the EXIM for the agency's financing of Australia Pacific LNG's liquid natural gas projects inside the Great Barrier Reef World Heritage Area. The lawsuit alleged that EXIM financing for the projects violates U.S. environmental and cultural heritage laws. Their amended lawsuit included EXIM's loan for the Australia Pacific LNG project and a $1.8 billion loan for the Queensland Curtis which together totaled $4.8 billion. In March 2016, a California federal judge ruled against the environmentalists arguing that the EXIM financing represented only 10% of the project which is backed by ConocoPhillips, Origin Energy Ltd. and Sinopec and rejecting the loan would not stop the project. The environmentalists appealed the decision.

In 2019 Friends of the Earth (US) criticized EXIM President Kimberly A Reed for supporting the liquid natural gas (LNG) industry despite the lifecycle climate impacts of the fossil fuel, citing the U.S. government's Fourth National Climate Assessment finding that more frequent and extreme weather events are severely damaging the environment and the economy, while increasing harm to human health and loss of life. Friends of the Earth (US) also criticized EXIM for approving $5 billion in financing the Mozambique LNG project, citing the project's damage to the surrounding ecosystem (including to endangered species), displacement of local communities, and lack of economic benefits for local people.

Criticism of green energy-based financings
Conversely the EXIM has also faced scrutiny for pursuing green energy projects. The EXIM provided $10 million of loan guarantees in 2011 to Solyndra, a company that ultimately became bankrupt.

See also 

 CoBank
 List of federal agencies in the United States
 Independent agencies of the United States government
 Title 12 of the Code of Federal Regulations
 List of export credit agencies

References

Further reading 

 Assessing Reform at the Export–Import Bank: Hearing before the Subcommittee on Monetary Policy and Trade of the Committee on Financial Services, U.S. House of Representatives, One Hundred Thirteenth Congress, First Session, June 13, 2013
 Robert Higgs Against Leviathan: Government Power and a Free Society. Oakland, Calif.: The Independent Institute, 2004
 The Use of Environmental and Social Criteria in Export Credit Agencies' Practices , by Markus Knigge et al. Published in 2003 by the Deutsche Gesellschaft fuer Technische Zusammenarbeit – GTZ

External links 
 
 Export–Import Bank in the Federal Register

Banks based in Washington, D.C.
Banks established in 1934
United States
Government agencies established in 1934
Government-owned companies of the United States
Independent agencies of the United States government
American companies established in 1934